The second season of Paris Hilton's My New BFF aired from June 2 to August 4, 2009, on MTV in the United States, and consists of 10 episodes.

Season overview
Thirteen women and three men competed in challenges in an attempt to become Paris's latest best friend "forever." Hilton said that she did not stay friends with the first season's winner Brittany Flickinger because "I loved her and I trusted her, but sometimes people get too caught up and they change". Previous contestant Nelson "Onch" Chung appeared as a co-host, while Natalie Reid (a professional Paris Hilton-lookalike who also appeared with Hilton in The Simple Life), made a special guest appearance as Hilton's double in the first episode. Other guest stars included Santino Rice, Kathy Hilton, Doug Reinhardt, Allison Melnick, Lil' Kim, Three Six Mafia, and Kathy Griffin. This is the first and so far only format of the series to include straight men in the competition. David and Chris were added to the competition in episode four, and they do not appear in promotional material for the season. On August 4, 2009, it was revealed in the finale that the contestant Stephen Hampton had won the competition.

Contestants

Elimination table

In episode 4, before the dinner party started, Paris surprised everyone by adding two game-changing contestants (Chris and David) to compete for her friendship.
Paris surprised everyone when she said she made a mistake by sending Stephen home, and ultimately, Paris wanted him as her BFF.

Key
 The contestant is female.
 The contestant is male.
 The contestant was originally put up for discussion, but the decision was reversed.
 The contestant won the episode's challenge and was safe from elimination.
 The contestant was eliminated, brought back as a guest, then was named Paris Hilton's new BFF.
 The contestant was named Paris Hilton's Pet and won the challenge.
 The contestant was named Paris Hilton's Pet.
 The contestant was named Paris Hilton's Pet half way through the episode. (Pet changed twice in one episode)
 The contestant was still wearing the Pet necklace from the previous episode.
 Paris gave the 2nd Pet necklace to Tiniecia when Stephen was eliminated. (Stefanie had the 1st Pet necklace)
 The contestant was up for discussion and was saved.
 The contestant was a special guest for the season finale.
 The contestant won the episode's challenge and was up for discussion at panel.
 The contestant was eliminated.
 The contestant wasn't put up for discussion and was suddenly eliminated at panel.
 The contestant was eliminated outside of panel.
 The contestant won the first challenge and became pet; but in the same episode, lost the second challenge, and was put up for discussion for losing the second challenge. (Pet changed twice in one episode)
 The contestant was named Paris Hilton's Pet, but was then put up for discussion at panel.
TTYN – Talk To You Never, the goodbye message for eliminated contestants.
TTYS – Talk To You Soon, the goodbye message for eliminated contestants that Paris wanted to keep in runner-up but not be "best" friends.

Episodes

References

External links
Paris Hilton's My New BFF Official Website
Paris Hilton's My New BFF Casting Website
Paris Hilton Fansite with show coverage & updates
Stephen's Official MTV Page
Paris Hilton's Official Myspace Page

2009 American television seasons